Coleophora seriphidii is a moth of the family Coleophoridae. It is found in Turkestan and Kyrgyzstan.

The larvae feed on the leaves of Artemisia turanica. They create a silky case which is broader in the central part. There are five or six stripes extending along the case. These are quite uniformly arranged, straight, narrow and barely perceptible at places. The valve is three-sided. The length of the case is 4.5–5 mm and it is brownish-gray in color, with brown longitudinal stripes. The case of young larvae is almost white however. Larvae can be found from the end of April to May. Fully fed larvae estivate and hibernate.

References

seriphidii
Moths of Asia
Moths described in 1978